The 2019 Toulon Tournament was an international association football tournament held in Bouches-du-Rhône, France. The twelve national teams involved in the tournament were required to register a squad of 22 players; only players in these squads were eligible to take part in the tournament.

Players marked in bold have been capped at full International level.

Group A

Chile
Head coach:  Bernardo Redín

England
Head coach:  Paul Simpson

Nathan Trott (West Ham United) and Easah Suliman (Aston Villa) were replaced by Ryan Schofield and Jamie Shackleton, respectively. Josh Dasilva was added after the original call-up.

Ryan Schofield, injured in the match against Portugal, was replaced by Nathan Bishop.

Japan
Head coach:  Akinobu Yokouchi

Portugal
Head coach:  Filipe Ramos

Diogo Capitão (Benfica) and Rafael Camacho (Liverpool) were replaced by Samuel Costa and Bernardo Sousa, respectively.

Celton Biai, injured in the match against Chile, was replaced by Francisco Meixedo.

Group B

Brazil
Head coach:  André Jardine

Luiz Felipe (Lazio), who withdrew injured, was replaced by Adryelson. CBF suspended, until the end of the tournament, Renan Lodi (Athletico Paranaense) and Rodrygo (Santos) after they were called-up and did not attend. They were replaced by Rogério and Paulinho, respectively. Gabriel Magalhães and Thiago Maia (Lille) were released by CBF. They were replaced by Bruno Fuchs and Lucas Fernandes, respectively.

France
Head coach:  Jean-Luc Vannuchi

Lévi Ntumba (Dijon) was replaced by Hugo Barbet. Bilal Benkhedim was added after the original call-up.

Guatemala
Head coach:  Érick González

Qatar
Head coach:  Albert Fernández Caballería

Group C

Bahrain
Head coach:  Samir Chammam

China PR
Head coach:  Guus Hiddink

Mexico
Head coach:  Jaime Lozano

Republic of Ireland
Head coach:  Stephen Kenny

Neil Farrugia (UCD) was replaced by Josh Barrett.

References

Toulon Tournament squads
2019 Toulon Tournament